Greenhill is a hill just north of Evesham, Worcestershire and was part of the site of the Battle of Evesham. In the battle, Simon de Montfort was defeated and killed on 4 August 1265. King Henry's son, Prince Edward, later Edward I used it as his base in the battle from where he launched his attack on Simon de Montfort's forces which were gathered around Evesham Abbey.

External links
 Battlefield trail map
 Battlefield photos from the Simon de Montfort Society Link Broken
 Battle of Evesham description

Military history of Worcestershire